Physalaemus kroyeri is a species of frog in the family Leptodactylidae. It is endemic to northeastern Brazil.

Physalaemus kroyeri is a very common, terrestrial frog. Its natural habitat is dry "Caatinga" savanna. It also occupies open areas where the Atlantic forest has been cleared. It is usually found near temporary ponds or in the water. It breeds in these temporary ponds, building a foam nest.

References

kroyeri
Endemic fauna of Brazil
Amphibians of Brazil
Taxonomy articles created by Polbot
Amphibians described in 1862